Topu Barman (born 20 December 1994) is a Bangladeshi professional footballer who plays as a centre back for Bangladesh Premier League team Bashundhara Kings, whom he captains and the Bangladesh national team.

Club career

Ealy Career

Tapu Burman was discovered in 2006 through Canary Wharf Group's talent search programme. After compelting the initial selection stage, Topu spent almost two years at the Bangladesh Krira Shikkha Protishtan under the supervision of local coaches Golam Sarwar Tipu and Rezaul Haq Jamal. In 2008, Topu along with a few U-16 national team players, were sent to attend a three week training session at the David Beckham Academy in London, for the final stage of the programme. Topu who was initially selected for the final stage by English coach Anthony Ferguson and England-born Bangladeshi footballer Anwar Uddin, was granted Tk 10,000 scolarship by the Canary Wharf Group, after completing its programme.

In 2009, he joined Dhaka First Division team Wari Club.

Bashundhara Kings

Topu Barman joined Bashundhara Kings on September 2019. He made his debut for Bashundhara during a 2019-20 Federation Cup match against Chittagong Abahani on 27 December 2019. His first goal for Bashundhara came against Bangladesh Police FC in the same competition on 1 January 2020. The Federation Cup was his first title with Bashundhara.

Before the start of the 2020–21 Federation Cup and 2021  league season Topu was named as the new captain of Bashundhara Kings after Daniel Colindres departed the side. Topu played twice during the tournament as Bashundhara won the trophy for the second year running. Topu helped Bashundhara Kings keep a solid defense as the club won the 2021 Bangladesh Premier League with 4 league games remaining. He ended the league season with a first-half brace against his former club and title rival Abahani Limited Dhaka. Scoring an own goal 28 minutes into the match and then making up for his error with a headed goal into the Abahani net 10 minutes later.

Interest from abroad
After the 2021 SAFF Championship Topu has had offers from NorthEast United FC who currently play in the Indian Super League, the topflight of Indian football and he also has attracted interest from an unknown club from the  Qatari Second Division also known as the Qatar Stars League

International career

Bangladesh national team
On 24 October 2014, at the age of 19 years, 11 months, and 5 days, Topu made his debut for Bangladesh national football team by playing a friendly match against Sri Lanka. He entered the field as a substitute for defender Yeasin Khan in the 63rd minute of the match, the game ended as 1-1.

On 28 December 2015, he scored his first goal in international football against Bhutan. Topu was named in the squad for the SAFF Championship: 2018 and had an impressive tournament even though hosts Bangladesh were not able to reach the knockout stages once more. He scored against both Bhutan and Pakistan during the group-stages. Topu also scored a crucial goal against Afghanistan during the 2022 FIFA World Cup qualification round helping Bangladesh reach the final stage of the 2023 AFC Asian Cup qualification round

On 1 October 2021, Topu kicked off the 2021 SAFF Championship with a calmly converted penalty against Sri Lanka earning the team a 1-0 victory and a winning start to the tournament. He also played the full 90 minutes against Nepal in the final group match of the competition for both sides where Bangladesh needed a win to reach the finals, the match concluded as 1-1, after a controversial late penalty call from the referee which ended Bangladesh national football teams hopes of reaching the finals once again.

On 13 November 2021, During the second matchday of the 2021 Four Nations Football Tournament, Topu scored an 86th minute penalty to give Bangladesh a memorable win against Maldives for the first time in 18 years. However,during the last group match against Sri Lanka with Bangladesh only needing a draw, Topu missed a first half penalty and after conceding late into the game Bangladesh suffered a 2-1 defeat, denying the country a place in an international tournament final again.

Career statistics

International apps

International goals

Scores and results list Bangladesh's goal tally first.

Personal life
Topu is dating Swarnali Krishna, a medical student, since 2015.  
  
From religious views, Topu is a follower of Hindu religion.

Honours
Bashundhara Kings
 Bangladesh Premier League: 2020–21
 Federation Cup: 2020–21

References

External links 
 
 Topu Barman at soccerway.com

1994 births
Living people
Footballers from Dhaka
Bangladeshi footballers
Bangladesh international footballers
Sheikh Russel KC players
Mohammedan SC (Dhaka) players
Abahani Limited (Dhaka) players
Bashundhara Kings players
Saif SC players
Bangladesh Football Premier League players
Association football defenders
Footballers at the 2014 Asian Games
Footballers at the 2018 Asian Games
Asian Games competitors for Bangladesh
South Asian Games bronze medalists for Bangladesh
South Asian Games medalists in football
People from Narayanganj District
Bangladeshi Hindus